The Ministry of Higher Education and Scientific Research (MOHESR) is the Iraq government agency responsible for higher education and scientific research. It monitors the work of universities and allocates their budgets. It is also responsible for the sponsorship of Iraqi students to study in overseas universities in Britain, the United States, Australia, and other countries, and has consulates in those places as well.

See also

 List of universities in Iraq

External links
 MOHESR official website 
 London Cultural Attaché website 

Higher education
Education in Iraq
Educational organizations based in Iraq
Iraq